Jibz Cameron is a performance, recording and video artist as well as an actor. Cameron also produces work as Dynasty Handbag, an alter ego created in 2001. Her performance art has been called "Outrageously smart, grotesque and innovative" by The New Yorker and referred to as "[...] one of the most insanely funny, tone-perfect pieces of performance art I have seen in years" by Jennifer Dunning in The New York Times. 

She has taught at universities as a visiting professor at California Institute of the Arts and an adjunct professor at Tisch School of the Arts at NYU. Her performances and video works have been presented at prestigious venues and festivals including the Andy Warhol Museum in Pittsburgh, the Hammer Museum in Los Angeles, The Kitchen, Redcat Theatre, Brooklyn Academy of Music, The New Museum in New York, Los Angeles County Museum of Art, Joe's Pub, Performa, the Portland Institute for Contemporary Art, Centre Pompidou, the Museum of Contemporary Art San Diego, SXSW and many more.

Jibz Cameron currently resides in Los Angeles. She hosts and produces Weirdo Night at Zebulon Cafe Concert. A 4-camera recorded version of Weirdo Night was selected for the 2021 Sundance Film Festival.  Cameron is a recipient of a 2022 Guggenheim Fellowship in Drama & Performance Art.

References 

Living people
American performance artists
Year of birth missing (living people)